Nail Gönenli (13 April 1924 – 1969) was a Turkish equestrian. He competed at the 1956 Summer Olympics and the 1960 Summer Olympics.

References

1924 births
1969 deaths
Turkish male equestrians
Olympic equestrians of Turkey
Equestrians at the 1956 Summer Olympics
Equestrians at the 1960 Summer Olympics
People from Gönen